The 42nd Saturn Awards, presented by the Academy of Science Fiction, Fantasy and Horror Films and honoring the best in science fiction, fantasy, horror, and other genres in film, television, home entertainment, and local theatre in 2015 and early 2016, were held on June 22, 2016 in Burbank, California, and hosted by actor John Barrowman. Nominations were announced on February 24, 2016. This ceremony featured several major changes on the television side, with all "Best Television Series" categories being replaced by new ones, with the exception of Best Superhero Adaptation Television Series.

Star Wars: The Force Awakens became the most nominated film in Saturn Award history, with nominations in all 13 categories it was eligible for (except Best Performance by a Younger Actor). With double nominations for both Best Actor (John Boyega and Harrison Ford) and Best Supporting Actress (Carrie Fisher and Lupita Nyong'o), The Force Awakens received a total of fifteen nominations, followed by Mad Max: Fury Road with ten (including a nomination in a "Home Entertainment" category) and Crimson Peak with nine. The Walking Dead led the nominations for television for the second year in a row with seven, including triple nominations for Best Supporting Actress on Television (Tovah Feldshuh, Danai Gurira, and Melissa McBride); Game of Thrones and Hannibal followed with five nominations each.

For film, Star Wars: The Force Awakens won the most awards with eight, including Best Science Fiction Film, Best Actor for Harrison Ford, and John Williams' eighth win for Best Music, with Crimson Peak being the only other film to score multiple wins with three, including Best Horror Film. For television, The Walking Dead won the most awards for the second year in a row with three wins, including the inaugural Best Horror Television Series and Chandler Riggs becoming the first individual to win Best Performance by a Younger Actor on Television twice; Hannibal and Outlander followed with two wins each.

Additionally, eight individuals earned double nominations: J. J. Abrams, Guillermo del Toro, Alex Garland, George Miller, and Colin Trevorrow were all nominated for both Best Director and Best Writing, with only Abrams winning for writing, while Neal Scanlan received nominations for both Best Make-up and Best Special Effects for The Force Awakens, winning both. Lastly, both Gillian Anderson and Jessica Chastain were the only acting nominees to receive two nominations for different works, with only the latter winning one: Best Supporting Actress for Crimson Peak.

Overview

Film
Star Wars: The Force Awakens won eight awards, tying The Lord of the Rings: The Return of the King (2003) as the second most award-winning film at the Saturn Awards, behind Avatar (2009), which won ten awards at the 36th Saturn Awards in 2010. The Force Awakens wins were for Best Science Fiction Film, Best Actor for Harrison Ford, Best Supporting Actor for Adam Driver, Best Writing (Lawrence Kasdan, J. J. Abrams, and Michael Arndt), Best Editing, Best Make-up, Best Music, and Best Special Effects.

This was only the second time a trio won Best Writing: Kasdan had already won the award for Raiders of the Lost Ark (1981) and had received nominations for two other Star Wars films: The Empire Strikes Back (1980) and Return of the Jedi (1983). It was also the first win in the category for both Abrams and Arndt, who had both been nominated once before; Abrams had also won Best Director four years earlier for Super 8 (2011) and would go on to win five years later for Star Wars: The Rise of Skywalker (2019). Ford had previously won Best Actor for Raiders and had already been nominated for playing his Star Wars character, Han Solo, at the 5th Saturn Awards in 1978.

Crimson Peak was the only other film to secure multiple wins: Best Horror Film, Best Supporting Actress for Jessica Chastain, and Best Production Design. This was Chastain's first win and fifth nomination, including her Best Actress nomination the same year for The Martian.

Eleven features won a single award: Ant-Man, Bridge of Spies, Cinderella, Furious 7, Inside Out, Room, and Turbo Kid won the other "Best Film" categories. Furthermore, The Martian won Best Director (Ridley Scott's first win since Alien at the 7th Saturn Awards in 1980), Mad Max: Fury Road won Best Actress for Charlize Theron (her first win and fifth nomination), Jurassic World won Best Performance by a Younger Actor for Ty Simpkins, and Avengers: Age of Ultron won Best Costume Design (Alexandra Byrne's second win).

Television
This year, the Saturn Awards introduced several new "Best Television Series" categories, replacing older ones: the fourth and final season of Continuum won the inaugural Best Science Fiction Film, winning its first and only Saturn Award after ten nominations overall. The second half of Outlanders first season (the first half having been aired the previous year) won the inaugural Best Fantasy Television Series, with its lead actress Caitríona Balfe winning Best Actress on Television for the second year in a row; Balfe would go on to win a third in 2021.

The Walking Dead, which had won the "Best Television Series" award it was nominated for all of its previous seasons (Best Television Presentation in 2011 and 2012, and Best Syndicated/Cable Television Series in 2013, 2014, and 2015), continued its long winning streak by winning the inaugural Best Horror Television Series. The series also won Best Supporting Actress in Television for Danai Gurira, while Chandler Riggs became the first performer to win Best Performance by a Younger Actor on Television twice; Riggs would go on to win a third in 2018, surpassing his own record. Hannibal concluded its own winning streak by winning Best Action / Thriller Television Series for its third and final season, after winning Best Network Television Series in 2014 and 2015. Its guest star Richard Armitage won Best Supporting Actor on Television, a year after winning Best Supporting Actor in a Film for The Hobbit: The Battle of the Five Armies.

The Flash won Best Superhero Adaptation Television Series, its second win in the same category, after winning the inaugural award the previous year, while Daredevil won the inaugural Best New Media Television Series.

Other award-winning programs were Haven winning Best Guest Starring Role on Television for William Shatner (his second win after Best Actor in a Film for Star Trek II: The Wrath of Khan at the 10th Saturn Awards in 1983), and Doctor Who, which won Best Television Presentation for its Christmas special "The Husbands of River Song". Although it is the first win in the category for the series itself, the eponymous 1996 film, which is a part of a common chronology, had won as well. Lastly, Ash vs Evil Dead won Best Actor on Television for Bruce Campbell, making it the third installment of the Evil Dead franchise to win a Saturn Award after The Evil Dead (1981) and Army of Darkness (1992).

Winners and nominees

Film

Television

Programs
{| class=wikitable
|-
! style="background:#EEDD82; width:50%" | Best Science Fiction Television Series
! style="background:#EEDD82; width:50%" | Best Fantasy Television Series
|-
| valign="top" |
 Continuum (Syfy) The 100 (The CW)
 Colony (USA Network)
 Doctor Who (BBC America)
 The Expanse (Syfy)
 Wayward Pines (Fox)
 The X-Files (Fox)
| valign="top" |
 Outlander (Starz) Game of Thrones (HBO)
 Haven (Syfy)
 Jonathan Strange & Mr Norrell (BBC America)
 The Magicians (Syfy)
 The Muppets (ABC)
 The Shannara Chronicles (MTV)
|-
! style="background:#EEDD82; width:50%" | Best Horror Television Series
! style="background:#EEDD82; width:50%" | Best Action / Thriller Television Series
|-
| valign="top" |
 The Walking Dead (AMC) American Horror Story: Hotel (FX)
 Ash vs Evil Dead (Starz)
 Fear the Walking Dead (AMC)
 Salem (WGN America)
 The Strain (FX)
 Teen Wolf (MTV)
| valign="top" |
 Hannibal (NBC) Bates Motel (A&E)
 Blindspot (NBC)
 Fargo (FX)
 The Last Ship (TNT)
 The Librarians (TNT)
 Mr. Robot (USA Network)
|-
! style="background:#EEDD82; width:50%" | Best Superhero Adaptation Television Series
! style="background:#EEDD82; width:50%" | Best New Media Television Series
|-
| valign="top" |
 The Flash (The CW) Agent Carter (ABC)
 Agents of S.H.I.E.L.D. (ABC)
 Arrow (The CW)
 Gotham (Fox)
 Legends of Tomorrow (The CW)
 Supergirl (CBS)
| valign="top" |
 Daredevil (Netflix) Bosch (Amazon)
 DreamWorks Dragons (Netflix)
 Jessica Jones (Netflix)
 The Man in the High Castle (Amazon)
 Powers (PlayStation Network)
 Sense8 (Netflix)
|-
! colspan="2" style="background:#EEDD82; width:50%" | Best Television Presentation
|-
| colspan="2" valign="top" |
 Doctor Who: The Husbands of River Song (BBC America) The Cannibal in the Jungle (Animal Planet)
 Childhood's End (Syfy)
 Sharknado 3: Oh Hell No! (Syfy)
 Turkey Hollow (Lifetime)
 The Wiz Live! (NBC)
|}

Acting

Home Entertainment
{| class=wikitable
|-
! style="background:#EEDD82; width:50%" | Best DVD or Blu-ray Release
! style="background:#EEDD82; width:50%" | Best DVD or Blu-ray Classic Film Release
|-
| valign="top" |
 Burying the Ex
 Big Game
 The Cobbler
 Monsters: Dark Continent
 The Tale of the Princess Kaguya
 Wolf Totem
| valign="top" |
 Miracle Mile
 Burnt Offerings
 Cemetery Without Crosses
 Ladyhawke
 The Monster That Challenged the World
 Tales of Terror
 X: The Man with the X-ray Eyes
|-
! style="background:#EEDD82; width:50%" | Best DVD or Blu-ray Special Edition Release
! style="background:#EEDD82; width:50%" | Best DVD or Blu-ray Television Release
|-
| valign="top" |
 X-Men: Days of Future Past: The Rogue Cut
 Furious 7 (Extended Edition)
 The Hobbit: The Battle of the Five Armies (Extended Edition)
 Society (Limited Edition)
 Vanilla Sky (Alternate Ending)
| valign="top" |
 The X-Files (The Collector's Set) Black Sails (Season 2)
 From Dusk till Dawn: The Series (Season 2)
 Hannibal (Season 3)
 Lost in Space (The Complete Adventures)
 My Favorite Martian (The Complete Series)
|-
! colspan="2" style="background:#EEDD82; width:50%" | Best DVD or Blu-ray Collection Release
|-
| colspan="2" valign="top" |
 The Frank Darabont Collection (The Shawshank Redemption, The Green Mile, and The Majestic) Horror Classics: Volume One (The Mummy, Dracula Has Risen from the Grave, Taste the Blood of Dracula, and Frankenstein Must Be Destroyed)
 Jurassic Park Collection (Jurassic Park, The Lost World: Jurassic Park, Jurassic Park III, and Jurassic World)
 Mad Max Anthology (Mad Max, Mad Max 2, Mad Max Beyond Thunderdome, and Mad Max: Fury Road)
 Nikkatsu Diamond Guys: Volume 1 (Voice Without a Shadow, Red Quay, and The Rambling Guitarist)
 Special Effects Collection (Son of Kong, Mighty Joe Young, The Beast from 20,000 Fathoms, and Them!)
|}

Local Stage Production
{| class=wikitable
|-
! style="background:#EEDD82; width:50%" | Best Local Stage Production
|-
| valign="top" |
 Tarzan (3-D Theatricals) An Act of God (Ahmanson Theatre)
 Bent (The Mark Taper Forum)
 Carrie: The Musical (La Mirada Theatre for the Performing Arts)
 The Lion King (Segerstrom Center for the Performing Arts)
 Side Show (3-D Theatricals)
|}

Special Achievement Awards
 President's Award – Haven
 Spotlight Award – Better Call Saul
 Dan Curtis Legacy Award – Eric Kripke
 Special Recognition Award – Brannon Braga
 George Pal Memorial Award – Simon Kinberg
 Lifetime Achievement Award – Nichelle Nichols
 Breakthrough Performance Award – Melissa Benoist for Supergirl

Multiple nominations and wins

Film

The following works received multiple nominations:

 15 nominations: Star Wars: The Force Awakens
 10 nominations: Mad Max: Fury Road
 9 nominations: Crimson Peak
 8 nominations: Jurassic World
 6 nominations: Ant-Man, Ex Machina, The Martian
 5 nominations: Baahubali: The Beginning, The Hateful Eight, Kingsman: The Secret Service
 4 nominations: Avengers: Age of Ultron, Sicario
 3 nominations: Furious 7
 2 nominations: 99 Homes, The Age of Adaline, Black Mass, Cinderella, Cop Car, Goodnight Mommy, Mission: Impossible – Rogue Nation, Mr. Holmes, The Revenant, Room, The Visit

The following works received multiple wins:

 8 wins: Star Wars: The Force Awakens
 3 wins: Crimson Peak

Television

The following works received multiple nominations:

 7 nominations: The Walking Dead
 5 nominations: Game of Thrones, Hannibal
 4 nominations: Daredevil, Supergirl, Wayward Pines, The X-Files
 3 nominations: Continuum, Doctor Who, Fear the Walking Dead, The Flash, Jessica Jones, Outlander, Teen Wolf
 2 nominations: Ash vs Evil Dead, Bosch, Fargo, Haven, The Librarians, The Strain

The following works received multiple wins:

 3 wins: The Walking Dead
 2 wins: Hannibal, Outlander

Notes

References

External links
 Official Saturn Awards website

Saturn Awards ceremonies
2016 film awards
2016 in California
2016 television awards
2016 in American cinema
2016 awards in the United States